is a former Japanese football player and manager.

Playing career
Hiraoka was born in Sakai on May 24, 1973. After graduating from high school, he joined his local club Gamba Osaka in 1992. He debuted in 1994 and became a regular player as left side midfielder and left side back in 1995. However he could hardly play in the match in 2000 and he moved to Nagoya Grampus Eight in August 2000. In 2003 he moved to Shimizu S-Pulse and played in 2 seasons. In 2005, he moved to Regional Leagues club FC Gifu. He played many matches and the club was promoted to Japan Football League from 2007. In 2007, the club won the 3rd place and was promoted to J2 League. However he retired end of 2007 season.

Coaching career
After retirement, Hiraoka became a manager for newly was promoted to Japan Football League club, MIO Biwako Kusatsu in 2008. He managed the club until August 2008.

Club statistics

References

External links

1973 births
Living people
Association football people from Osaka Prefecture
Japanese footballers
J1 League players
Japan Football League players
Gamba Osaka players
Nagoya Grampus players
Shimizu S-Pulse players
FC Gifu players
Japanese football managers
Association football defenders
People from Sakai, Osaka